Michael Roberds (January 18, 1964 – May 15, 2016) was a Canadian actor who starred in YTV's The New Addams Family as Uncle Fester.

Early life
Roberds began reading by the age of three. He performed the role of Big Bird in the school play "Christmas on Sesame Street" at age five.  He entertained his neighbours by reading them jokes at parties and quickly grew to enjoy the attention.
Throughout his school career, he was active in theater productions and began acting professionally in 1987 when he did his first television commercial for GM.

Career 
He wrote and performed sketches for David Chalk's Computer Show, in addition to roles on the mystery drama series Strange Luck and in Ernest Goes to School starring Jim Varney. He starred on Fox Family's The New Addams Family as Uncle Fester. His television guest appearances include Da Vinci's City Hall, Supernatural, and Police Academy. Roberds was also a member of the comedy troupe "Almost Midnight".

Personal life
Roberds died after a brief illness on May 15, 2016.

Filmography

Film

Television

References

External links

TV.com : Michael Roberds
Brenna and Brittany Interview - Michael Roberds - August 1999
Michael Roberds(Aveleyman)

1964 births
2016 deaths
20th-century Canadian male actors
21st-century Canadian male actors
Canadian male film actors
Canadian male television actors
People from Langley, British Columbia (city)
Male actors from Vancouver